This article details the qualifying phase for diving at the 2024 Summer Olympics.  The competition at these Games will comprise a total of 136 divers coming from their respective NOCs; each can enter a maximum of two divers per gender in the individual events and a gender-based pair in the synchronized events, respecting a sixteen-member (eight per gender) country limit. To be eligible for the Games, all divers must be 14 years old and above on or before December 31, 2023; and must participate in various international meets approved by FINA.

Timeline

Qualification summary

Synchronized diving
Each synchronized diving event features eight teams from their respective NOCs, composed of the following:
 3: the top three (or the medal-winning) pairs at the 2023 FINA World Championships, scheduled for July 14 to 30, in Fukuoka, Japan
 4: the top four pairs vying for qualification at the 2024 FINA World Championships, scheduled for February 2 to 18,  in Doha, Qatar
 1: reserved for the host country France

Men's 3 m synchronized springboard

Men's 10 m synchronized platform

Women's 3 m synchronized springboard

Women's 10 m synchronized platform

Individual diving
The qualification spots for each of the individual springboard and platform diving events (both men and women) will be attributed as follows:
 2023 World Championships – The top twelve finalists of each individual event will obtain a quota place for their NOC at the 2023 FINA World Championships, scheduled for July 14 to 30, in Fukuoka, Japan.
 Continental Qualification Tournaments – The winners of each individual event will obtain a quota place for their NOC at one of the five continental meets (Africa, the Americas, Asia, Europe, and Oceania) approved by FINA.
 2024 World Championships – Twelve highest-ranked divers eligible for qualification will obtain a quota place for their NOC in each individual event at the 2024 FINA World Championships, scheduled for February 2 to 18,  in Doha, Qatar, respecting the two-member country limit and without surpassing the total quota of 136.
 Reallocation – Additional spots will be entitled to the eligible divers placed thirteenth and above in their corresponding individual events, respecting the two-member country limit, at the 2024 FINA World Championships until they attain the total quota of 136.
 Host nation – As the host country, France reserves four men's and four women's spots to be distributed in each of the individual diving events.

Men's 3 m springboard

Men's 10 m platform

Women's 3 m springboard

Women's 10 m platform

References

Qualification for the 2024 Summer Olympics
2023 in diving
2024 in diving
Qualification